Leah Davidson (born 28 March 2001) is an Australian professional women's footballer who plays as a defender for Melbourne City.

Club career

Youth career
In 2013, Davidson started her youth career playing for the U-13's Palm Beach Girls. She scored 13 goals in 18 matches in the 2013 season and finished 5th on the ladder.

Throughout her entire Brisbane Roar career, she played 23 matches and scored 6 goals when playing for the U13s and U14s.

Davidson was also selected to play for the Australian under-20 team during the qualification process for the 2019 AFC U-19 Women's Championship.

Brisbane Roar
At the age of 17, she competed in the women's NPL in Queensland. She was part of the Championship winning side with Roar/NTC during the 2018 season and scored seven goals in 16 matches.

On 28 October 2018, Leah Davidson played her first professional career game in a 1–1 draw against Perth Glory coming on as a substitute for Allira Toby.

Melbourne City
In November 2020, Davidson joined Melbourne City.

References

External links
 Leah Davidson at Soccerway

2001 births
Living people
Brisbane Roar FC (A-League Women) players
Melbourne City FC (A-League Women) players
A-League Women players
Women's association football defenders
Australian women's soccer players